Kushe is a rural municipality located in Jajarkot District of Karnali Province of Nepal.

Paink, Dhime, Archhani, Talegaun and some parts of Pajaru which previously were all separate Village development committees merged to form this new local level body. Fulfilling the requirement of the new Constitution of Nepal 2015, Ministry of Federal Affairs and General Administration replaced all old VDCs and Municipalities into 753 new local level bodies.

The rural municipality is divided into total 9 wards and the headquarters of this newly formed rural municipality is situated at Dhime.

Demographics
At the time of the 2011 Nepal census, 99.0% of the population in Kushe Rural Municipality spoke Nepali and 0.9% Kham as their first language, 0.1% spoke other languages.

In terms of ethnicity/caste, 31.6% were Thakuri, 26.3% Chhetri, 18.5% Kami, 8.8% Hill Brahmin, 7.0% Magar, 3.0% Sarki, 2.9% Damai/Dholi, 1.0% Badi, 0.6% Sanyasi/Dasnami and 0.4% others.

In terms of religion, 98.8% were Hindu, 0.8% Christian and 0.4% Buddhist.

References

External links
 Official website

Populated places in Jajarkot District
Rural municipalities in Karnali Province
Rural municipalities of Nepal established in 2017